The Return of Captain Nemo (theatrical title: The Amazing Captain Nemo) is a 1978 American science fiction adventure television miniseries directed by Alex March and Paul Stader (the latter directed the underwater sequences), and loosely based on characters and settings from Jules Verne's 1870 novel Twenty Thousand Leagues Under the Sea. It was written by six screenwriters including Robert Bloch and has been considered an attempt by producer Irwin Allen to duplicate the success of his Voyage to the Bottom of the Sea.

Overview
During naval exercises in 1978, Captain Nemo (played by José Ferrer) is found in suspended animation aboard his submarine Nautilus beneath the Pacific Ocean. Revived by members of a modern-day US Government agency, Nemo is persuaded to rescue United States interests and in so doing battles with Professor Waldo Cunningham, a mad scientist played by Burgess Meredith.

Not originally aired as a movie, it was divided into three parts ("Deadly Blackmail", "Duel in the Deep" and "Atlantis Dead Ahead") expanded somewhat with about 45 minutes of additional footage over the three episodes to become a very brief action series. Sometimes described as a "miniseries", it was intended to be the first story-arc in an ongoing serial. Ratings were dismal, and the series never materialized.

Instead this proved to be Irwin Allen's final foray into weekly science fiction television.

Robert Bloch makes no mention of the series in his autobiography (Once Around the Bloch) but commented on it in an interview: "I did an episode for a show about five years ago which was an abortive attempt at a science-fiction series (editor's note: The Return of Captain Nemo). The network gave the go-ahead on it, and they were going to do a four-part story. They assigned each individual episode to a different writer. You had four writers working, neither one of them knew what the other ones were doing, and they had a three-week deadline! And it went off the air after those first four weeks."   Bloch's segment (co-written with Larry Alexander) was titled "Atlantis Dead Ahead"  although in the theatrical release there are no titles for individual segments of the story.

The Return of Captain Nemo was a co-production between Irwin Allen Productions and Warner Bros. Television. It was originally shown in the United States as a three part miniseries (60-minutes each episode) on CBS from March 8–22, 1978 and portions of the three-episode series were then re-edited into a 102-minute version released theatrically overseas as The Amazing Captain Nemo.

Cast
 José Ferrer as Captain Nemo
 Burgess Meredith as Professor Waldo Cunningham
 Mel Ferrer as Dr. Robert Cook
 Horst Buchholz as King Tibor of Atlantis
 Tom Hallick as Tom Franklin
 Burr DeBenning as Jim Porter
 Lynda Day George as Kate
 Warren Stevens as Miller
 Med Flory as Tor (silver android)
 Anthony McHugh as Radio Operator
 Randolph Roberts as Helmsman
 Richard Angarola as Trog (leader of Atlantis Great Council)
 Anthony Geary as Bork (an Atlantean)
 Stephen Powers as Lloyd
 Yale Summers as Sirak (an Atlantean)

Episodes

Awards
In 1978, The Return of Captain Nemo received two Emmy Award nominations for Outstanding Individual Achievement in Any Area of Creative Technical Crafts. These were for Frank Van der Veer (optical effects) and L.B. Abbott (special photographic effects).

References 
 Wingrove, David. Science Fiction Film Source Book (Longman Group Limited, 1985)

External links
 
 The Return of Captain Nemo at TV Acres

1978 films
1970s American television miniseries
1970s science fiction adventure films
American science fiction adventure films
Films based on Twenty Thousand Leagues Under the Sea
Films produced by Irwin Allen
Films scored by Richard LaSalle
Films set in 1978
Films set in Washington, D.C.
Films set in San Francisco
Films set in Atlantis
Films with screenplays by Robert Bloch
CBS original programming
Television series by Warner Bros. Television Studios
Underwater civilizations in fiction
Warner Bros. films
1970s American films